Μenoume Ellada (translation: "We stay in Greece") is a Greek television series, aired by the Hellenic Broadcasting Corporation. It is aired Monday to Friday at 2pm (EET) on ET1 and 01:00 UTC (00:00 UTC during daylight hours) on ERT World (until November 2006 ERT Sat). This program showcases beautiful Greece and all it has to offer. 4 teams of reporters scour the country to bring the viewer to various points of interest, from small villages, to historical sites and local culture. The show also features live pictures from 40 different locations via webcams and also provides constantly updated weather conditions for various cities and traffic updates from national and regional road- all on the TV screen. Hosted by Giorgos Amyras & Renia Tsitsibikou.

Episodes

These live locations has filmed famous landmarks and places including (in chronological order), its videos are shown in Greek:

External links
Menoume Ellada - ERT website

Hellenic Broadcasting Corporation original programming
2006 Greek television series debuts
2000s Greek television series
2010s Greek television series
Greek-language television shows
Television series about Greece